Sara Krnjić (born July 15, 1991) is a Serbian professional women's basketball player who plays for UNIQA Euroleasing Sopron of the Hungarian League. She also represents the Serbia national basketball team.

International career
She represented Serbian national basketball team at the EuroBasket 2015 in Budapest where they won the gold medal, and qualified for the 2016 Olympics, first in the history for the Serbian team.

See also 
 List of Serbian WNBA players

References

External links
Sara Krnjić at eurobasket.com
Sara Krnjić at fiba.com
Sara Krnjić at fibaeurope.com

1991 births
Living people
Basketball players at the 2016 Summer Olympics
Centers (basketball)
European champions for Serbia
Medalists at the 2016 Summer Olympics
Olympic basketball players of Serbia
Olympic bronze medalists for Serbia
Olympic medalists in basketball
Serbian expatriate basketball people in Hungary
Serbian expatriate basketball people in Poland
Serbian women's basketball players
Basketball players from Novi Sad
Washington Mystics draft picks
ŽKK Vojvodina players